Trinity Park is a coastal  suburb of Cairns in the Cairns Region, Queensland, Australia.

Geography 

Trinity Park is one of Cairns' northern suburbs. It is bounded to the north-east by the Coral Sea, to the east by Half Moon Creek and to the west by the Captain Cook Highway. The land is low-lying flat land (below 10 metres above sea level). The western half of the suburb is freehold land, mostly developed as residential housing. The eastern half of the suburb remains Crown land and is not developed.

History 
Trinity Park is situated in the Djabugay (Tjapukai) traditional Aboriginal country.

The suburb takes its name from Trinity Bay, which was named on Trinity Sunday 1770 by Lieutenant James Cook RN of HM Bark Endeavour.

Holy Cross School opened on 28 January 1987.

Education 
Holy Cross School is a Roman Catholic primary (P-6) school for boys and girls in Reed Road. It is operated by the Roman Catholic Diocese of Cairns. As at 2018, it has an enrolment of 525 students with 36 teachers (33 full-time equivalent) and 33 non-teaching staff (15 full-time equivalent).

There are no government schools in Trinity Park but Trinity Beach State School is in neighbouring Trinity Beach and Smithfield State High School is in neighbouring Smithfield.

Amenities 

There is a marina with 108 berths which connects to Half Moon Creek which leads into the Coral Sea.

Holy Cross Catholic Church is in Reed Road. It is within the Northern Beaches Parish of the Roman Catholic Diocese of Cairns.

References

External links